The Pick Motor Company Limited of Stamford, Lincolnshire was a British motor vehicle manufacturer that flourished between 1899 and 1925. It also traded briefly under the name New Pick Motor Company.

Origin
Founder John (Jack) Henry Pick (1857–1954) was a blacksmith. He had experience of working with Blackstone & Co, a Stamford farm implement maker which had begun to make oil engines. Jack Pick became a bicycle dealer before he started to make cars in 1898.

Vehicles

included:
 1898 dogcart
 1900 rear-engined 2-seater
 1901 4 hp front-engined (as illustrated)
 1903 6 hp 2-cylinder boxer engine (as illustrated)
 1903 10 hp 2-cylinder 1432 c.c. (as illustrated)
 1908 12/14 hp 4-cylinder 2957 c.c.
 1909 14/16 hp with either 2532 c.c. or 3232 c.c.
 1912 16/18 hp 3601 c.c.
 1913 20 hp 3601 c.c.
 1923 22½ hp 3601 c.c.

Premises
A factory was built in Blackfriars Street in the centre of Stamford in 1903 but disagreements with investors led to its sale to a printing firm. A new works was established on High Street St Martin's Stamford. Built in one of Britain's most elegant Georgian streets it was a former coachmaker's shop vacated by Pick & Co in 1925.

By the end of the 20th century, St Martin's Garage is now an antiques centre.

Exports
Pick cars are known to exist in Australia and there are records of six surviving cars in New Zealand.

Greengrocer
After closing the motor business Pick traded as a greengrocer from 11 High Street where he had also once made cars.

National news item, National Insurance — pay and conditions

See also
 Pick of Stamford: History of the Pick Motor Company by Michael Key, Paul Watkins Publishing, Stamford, 1994

References

External links

 1901 4 hp voiturette
 registration documents and image of car

Defunct motor vehicle manufacturers of England
Companies based in Stamford, Lincolnshire
Vehicle manufacturing companies established in 1899
Vehicle manufacturing companies disestablished in 1925
1899 establishments in England
1925 disestablishments in England
British companies disestablished in 1925
British companies established in 1899